John Warlick McDonald (February 18, 1922 – May 17, 2019) was an American diplomat. He was appointed to the rank of ambassador twice by Jimmy Carter and twice by Ronald Reagan to represent the United States at United Nations World Conferences. From 1974 to 1978, he was the deputy director general of the International Labour Organization.

McDonald was born in Koblenz, Germany, while his father was stationed there with the U.S. military. He had B.A. and a J.D. degrees from the University of Illinois at Urbana–Champaign and graduated from the National War College in 1967. After receiving his law degree, McDonald entered the U.S. Foreign Service.

McDonald co-founded Global Water and later founded the Institute for Multi-Track Diplomacy.

Personal life 
McDonald married Barbara Stewart in 1943. They had four children, including Lynn McDonald, and six grandchildren, including Ben Wikler.

Awards 
McDonald was a 1994 nominee for the Nobel Peace Prize. In 2009, he received the Peacemaker Award from the Association for Conflict Resolution.

McDonald received honorary degrees from Salisbury University, St. John's University, Teikyo University and Mount Mercy University.

References

External links 
 Appearances on C-SPAN

2019 deaths
1922 births
University of Illinois Urbana-Champaign alumni
National War College alumni
United Nations officials
Carter administration personnel
Reagan administration personnel
American diplomats
American expatriates in Germany